Idiopathic pneumonia syndrome is a set of pneumonia-like symptoms that occur with no sign of infection in the lung. Idiopathic pneumonia syndrome is a serious condition that can occur after a stem cell transplant. It occurs between 2.2 and 15 percent of hematopoietic stem cell transplants. The incubation period ranges between 4 and 106 days, but mostly is about 22 days from transplant.

Symptoms 
The symptoms are like pneumonia, and include fever, chills, coughing, and breathing problems. Lack of oxygen may also occur.

Risk factors 
Risk factors for IPS can be old age, graft vs host disease, multi organ failure, and multiple organ failure.

Diagnosis

Treatment 
Treatment is only supportive, with steroids showing no effect. The need for mechanical ventilation is indicative of a poor prognosis. Steroids are often used, though often without effect.

References 

 Idiopathic pneumonia syndrome entry in the public domain NCI Dictionary of Cancer Terms

Pneumonia
Syndromes affecting the lung